Thiomonas islandica is a Gram-negative, rod-shaped, motile bacterium from the genus Thiomonas, which has the ability to oxidise sulfur compounds and hydrogen. It was isolated from a hot spring in Graendalur in southwestern Iceland.

References

External links
Type strain of Thiomonas islandica at BacDive -  the Bacterial Diversity Metadatabase

Comamonadaceae
Bacteria described in 2011